Drimys roraimensis is a broadleaf evergreen tree of family Winteraceae. it is native to the tepuis, flat-topped mountains in southern Venezuela and western Guyana.

Range and habitat
Drimys roraimensis is endemic to montane cloud forests of the tepuis, where it is found on mountain slopes, along streams, and in swamps between 1,800 and 2,500 meters elevation.

The species' estimated extent of occurrence (EOO) is estimated as 357,372 km2. The estimated area of occupancy is 140 km2, which is likely an under-estimate because of the low number of collections.

References

roraimensis
Flora of northern South America
Flora of the Tepuis